William Karlsen (26 July 1910 – 5 October 1986) was a Norwegian backstroke swimmer. He was born in Sarpsborg. He competed at the 1932 Summer Olympics in Los Angeles. He was awarded the King's Cup in 1931, 1933, 1934 and 1936.

References

External links

1910 births
1986 deaths
People from Sarpsborg
Norwegian male backstroke swimmers
Olympic swimmers of Norway
Swimmers at the 1932 Summer Olympics
Sportspeople from Viken (county)
20th-century Norwegian people